Alexander Sergeyevich Krestinin (born 19 September 1978) is a Russian professional football manager and a former player. He is the current manager of Kyrgyzstan national team.

Career
In 1995, he began his professional career for the FC Kolos Krasnodar as a defender. He played for clubs FC Rostselmash-d, FC Kuban Krasnodar, FC Krasnoznamensk, FC Gazovik Orenburg, FC Caspiy, FC Spartak Tambov, FC Reutov, FC Don Novomoskovsk, FC Yassy-Sayram, FC Nara-ShBFR Naro-Fominsk, FC Spartak Shchyolkovo, FC Smena Komsomolsk-na-Amure, FK Metallurg Krasnoyarsk and FC Neftchi Kochkor-Ata.

Alexander Krestinin started his coaching career in FC Neftchi Kochkor-Ata. Since 21 October 2014 he is a coach of the Kyrgyzstan national football team.

On 2 June 2017, Krestinin was appointed as a manager of FC Dordoi Bishkek, until the end of 2018, whilst keeping his Kyrgyzstan national team job. As coach of Kyrgyzstan, the team underwent significant improvement, and Kyrgyzstan has finally qualified to the 2019 AFC Asian Cup for the first time. Krestinin was accredited for the team's success.

On 1 November 2021, Dordoi Bishkek announced that Krestinin would leave his post as Head Coach at the end of the season after 169 matches with the club.

Honours

Manager
Dordoi Bishkek
Kyrgyz Premier League: 2018, 2019, 2020, 2021
Kyrgyzstan Cup: 2017, 2018
Super Cup: 2019, 2021

Managerial statistics

References

External links
 

1978 births
Living people
Russian footballers
Russian expatriate footballers
Association football defenders
FC Kuban Krasnodar players
FC Orenburg players
FC Caspiy players
FC Spartak Tambov players
FC Khimik-Arsenal players
FC Yenisey Krasnoyarsk players
FC Dordoi Bishkek managers
Russian First League players
Russian Second League players
Russian football managers
Russian expatriate football managers
Expatriate footballers in Kazakhstan
Expatriate footballers in Kyrgyzstan
Expatriate football managers in Kyrgyzstan
Kyrgyzstan national football team managers
Sportspeople from Krasnodar
FC Rostov players
2019 AFC Asian Cup managers
FC Smena Komsomolsk-na-Amure players
Russian expatriate sportspeople in Kyrgyzstan